Ivan Vladimirovich Lazarev (Russian: Иван Владимирович Лазарев; born January 31, 1991) is a Russian professional basketball player for BC Samara of the VTB United League. He is a 2.10 m (6'10¾") tall power forward-center.

Professional career
After playing with the youth clubs of Dynamo Moscow and Dynamo Moscow's 2nd team (Dynamo Moscow 2), Lazarev has played professionally with the Russian clubs Triumph Lyubertsy, Zenit Saint Petersburg, BC Ryazan, CSKA Moscow, Parma, Runa]], BC MBA, and UNICS.

On July 15, 2022, he has signed with BC Samara of the VTB United League.

Russian national team
Lazarev was a member of the junior national teams of Russia. With Russia's junior national teams, he played at the 2009 FIBA Europe Under-18 Championship.

References

External links
Euroleague.net Profile
FIBA Archive Profile
FIBA Europe Profile
Draftexpress.com Profile
Eurobasket.com Profile

1991 births
Living people
BC Zenit Saint Petersburg players
Centers (basketball)
PBC CSKA Moscow players
Power forwards (basketball)
Russian men's basketball players
People from Orekhovo-Zuyevo
Sportspeople from Moscow Oblast